The canton of Jarville-la-Malgrange is an administrative division of the Meurthe-et-Moselle department, northeastern France. Its borders were modified at the French canton reorganisation which came into effect in March 2015. Its seat is in Jarville-la-Malgrange.

It consists of the following communes:

Azelot
Burthecourt-aux-Chênes
Coyviller
Fléville-devant-Nancy
Heillecourt
Houdemont
Jarville-la-Malgrange
Ludres
Lupcourt
Manoncourt-en-Vermois
Saint-Nicolas-de-Port
Ville-en-Vermois

References

Cantons of Meurthe-et-Moselle